This is a list of DVD releases for The Octonauts.

Region 1 
Octonauts is distributed on region 1 DVD in US by NCircle Entertainment.

Region 2 
The BBC, initially with 2 Entertain and then Abbey Home Media Group, released a number of Octonauts DVDs in the United Kingdom in the Region 2 format:

The BBC, initially with 2 Entertain and then Abbey Home Media Group, produced a number of DVD box sets, featuring three separate DVD releases apiece.

Region 4 
Octonauts is distributed on region 4 DVD in Australia by Roadshow Entertainment on behalf of the ABC.

The first four DVDs ("Meet the Octonauts!", "To The Gups!", "Ready For Action" & "Sound the Octoalert!") have sold together as the Octonauts Starter Pack since 2 March 2016

See also
 The Octonauts - The Octonauts series main page
 List of The Octonauts episodes - A complete list of each episode of The Octonauts.

References

Lists of home video releases
Lists of British children's television series episodes